Erekovci is a village in the municipality of Prilep, North Macedonia.

Demographics
The Yugoslav census of 1953 recorded 1003 people of whom 736 were Turks, 256 Macedonians and 1 Romani. The 1961 Yugoslav census recorded 789 people of whom 698 were Macedonians, 89 Turks and 2 others. The 1971 census recorded 643 people of whom 624 were Macedonians, 16 Turks, 1 Albanian and 2 others. The 1981 Yugoslav census recorded 684 people of whom 677 were Macedonians and 7 Turks. The Macedonian census of 1994 recorded 455 people of whom 450 were Macedonians, 4 Turks and 1 other.

According to the 2002 census, the village had a total of 385 inhabitants. Ethnic groups in the village include:

Macedonians 382 
Serbs 1
Others 2

References

External links

Villages in Prilep Municipality